The Big Machine is the fourth studio album by French singer, composer and producer Émilie Simon, released on 14 September 2009, by Barclay. The album is completely in English; no French songs were included on the album. However, some songs have fragments in French.

Promotion
Four viral videos have been posted on her official MySpace page. The videos include the same artwork used on her official website, created by AATOAA. The first one includes the full album version of "Dreamland" which is the lead single of the album. The second one includes a 36-second instrumental sample of "Chinatown". And, the third one includes a 50s snippet of "Rocket to the Moon". The fourth one appeared on her official site only promoting the digital release of the album, it includes "Rainbow".

The viral videos for "Dreamland", "Chinatown" and "Rocket to the Moon" were made available for free download from her official new website, launched on September 21 and designed by La Jungle Design.

Several songs from the album have been also performed live during her summer shows solo tour and other ones with her back band.

Track listing
The album was released digitally on September 14, 2009 in France.
The songs were composed by Émilie and co-written by English novelist Graham Joyce ("Rainbow", "Nothing to Do with You", "Fools Like Us", "The Way I See You" and "This Is Your World") and Faroese singer-songwriter Teitur Lassen ("Rocket to the Moon").

Release history

Singles
"Dreamland" is the lead single from the album, it was made available for digital download on June 8, 2009. The download is a radio edit of the song that lasts 3:58. A music video for the song was released on YouTube in September.
"Rainbow", a digital single is available for download from November 23, 2009. The single includes the radio edit of the song with a length of 3:38. A music video was released through her official YouTube channel on November 15, 2009.

Other songs
Performed during the shows:
"Mercy Street" (Peter Gabriel cover)
"Smalltown Boy" (Bronski Beat cover)
"The Ballad Of The Big Machine" (featuring Charlie Winston)

Personnel

Engineering and production
Mark Plati - recording
Renaud Létang - mixing
François Chevallier

Instruments
Jeremy Gara - drums
Darren Beckett - drums
Adam Chilenski - bass
Kelly Pratt - brass
John Natchez - brass

Charts

Album

External links

References

Émilie Simon albums
2009 albums
Electropop albums